= Rucanelo =

Coordinates: 36°03′S 64°49′W

- Rural locality and village
- Interactive map of Rucanelo
- Country: Argentina
- Province: La Pampa Province
- Time zone: UTC−3 (ART)

Rucanelo is a village and rural locality (municipality) in La Pampa Province in Argentina.
